In enzymology, a 3-hydroxypimeloyl-CoA dehydrogenase is an enzyme that catalyzes the chemical reaction

3-hydroxypimeloyl-CoA + NAD+  3-oxopimeloyl-CoA + NADH + H+

Thus, the two substrates of this enzyme are 3-hydroxypimeloyl-CoA and NAD+, whereas its 3 products are 3-oxopimeloyl-CoA, NADH, and H+.

This enzyme belongs to the family of oxidoreductases, specifically those acting on the CH-OH group of donor with NAD+ or NADP+ as acceptor. The systematic name of this enzyme class is 3-hydroxypimeloyl-CoA:NAD+ oxidoreductase. This enzyme participates in benzoate degradation via coa ligation.

References

 

EC 1.1.1
NADH-dependent enzymes
Enzymes of unknown structure